Lachenalia namibiensis is a species of plant that is endemic to Namibia.  Its natural habitat is cold desert.

References

 

Flora of Namibia
namibiensis
Least concern plants
Taxonomy articles created by Polbot